Democracy House Project is a non-profit organization founded by Professor Jeffrey Nielsen of Westminster College, Salt Lake City and Utah Valley University, Orem, Utah.

The Project is an educational initiative using his peer-based model to teach political literacy in communities, adult education programs, and schools in order to recreate and rejuvenate democracy one person, one household, and one issue at a time. The Democracy House Projects also assists local governments in organizing and training citizen councils to serve as audit and advisory bodies on public policy issues.

Objectives
The stated aim of DHP is to transform the political culture of democratic countries. DHP accomplishes this transformation by training citizens in political literacy. DHP also convenes issue groups of randomly selected citizens to consider reasonable and ethical solutions to the problems facing our country through the peer deliberation process. The Democracy House Project states it is seeking to help realize the Jeffersonian ideal of experiencing public freedom and public happiness through genuine participation with one another in our democracy as peers.

Professor Nielsen has defined political literacy as citizens being able to understand and discuss intelligently the following:

The meaning and origin of democracy – especially the moral meaning and foundations of democracy.
The nature of the authority to govern in a democracy (sovereignty of the people as mediated through the rule of law), and the regulative ideals of democracy; namely: liberty, equality, rights, and justice.
The basic forms of democratic government: direct democracy and indirect democracy (or representative democracy): presidential/congress and parliamentarian, along with an understanding of the nature and functions of the separate branches of government; such as, executive, legislative, and judicial.
The levels of government from the local community level all the way up to the federal level and how law and regulation are made, and how together they form the public policy of the various governing institutions; and how to be engaged as a citizen lobbyist to demand real participation in the creation of public policy. 
Basic critical thinking skills – how to evaluate arguments, evidence, and information sources including the media.
Basic communication skills – both speaking well and listening sincerely to different viewpoints, along with conflict resolution skills.
Peer-based deliberation skills to be able to form consensus in groups and arrive at well-reasoned decisions.
The diversity of cultural, religious, and ethnic traditions present in the community.
How to network and get involved with local community groups in order to participate actively in public life and find new ways to be engaged at the grassroots level.
A basic understanding of – or how to get information on – the important issues facing our common lives as we live together in a genuine democracy.

Non-profit organizations based in Utah